United Nations Security Council resolution 1120, adopted unanimously on 14 July 1997, after recalling previous resolutions on Croatia including 1023 (1995), 1025 (1995), 1037 (1996), 1043 (1996), 1069 (1996) and 1079 (1996), the Council extended the mandate of the United Nations Transitional Authority for Eastern Slavonia, Baranja and Western Sirmium (UNTAES) until 15 January 1998.

The Croatian regions of eastern Slavonia, Baranja and Western Sirmium were governed by the United Nations mission, UNTAES. In an agreement with the local Serb community in these regions, the safety of all citizens was a priority. It was important that the Government of Croatia allowed refugees and displaced persons to return home safely. There was concern that human rights in the region, including those of ethnic minorities, were not being respected and there was a lack of co-operation with the International Criminal Tribunal for the former Yugoslavia. The detrimental effect of the Amnesty Law was also highlighted by the council, as it had negatively affected confidence and trust among ethnic communities in Croatia.

Acting under Chapter VII of the United Nations Charter, the Council reiterated the importance it attached to the full implementation of all agreements by the parties, and for full co-operation with the United Nations and international organisations. At the same time, the importance of the respect for the human rights of all ethnic groups was stressed, particularly as Croatia was obstructing the return of refugees. Local Serbs in the three regions were reminded to adopt a constructive attitude towards reintegration into the rest of Croatia. All ambiguities within the Amnesty Law were asked to be removed and for it to be implemented fairly.

The Security Council endorsed plans for the restructuring of UNTAES by withdrawing the military component and devolution of executive powers. It was urged to co-operate with the Stabilisation Force authorised in Resolution 1088 (1996) in neighbouring Bosnia and Herzegovina. The Secretary-General was instructed to report to the council by 6 October 1997 on aspects relating to the reintegration of the region. It was important that the area be demilitarised and a liberal border regime was established. Finally, the Croatian government was urged to initiate a national reconciliation programme.

See also
 Breakup of Yugoslavia
 Croatian War of Independence
 Dayton Agreement
 List of United Nations Security Council Resolutions 1101 to 1200 (1995–1997)
 Yugoslav Wars
 United Nations Transitional Authority for Eastern Slavonia, Baranja and Western Sirmium
 Eastern Slavonia, Baranja and Western Syrmia
 Joint Council of Municipalities

References

External links
 
Text of the Resolution at undocs.org

 1120
 1120
1997 in Yugoslavia
1997 in Croatia
 1120
Joint Council of Municipalities
July 1997 events